Associação Desportiva de Macuácua is a football club based in Macuácua (Manjacaze District), Gaza Province, Mozambique, which currently competes in the Moçambola 2 (South Zone). AD Macuácua was founded for employees of the Construções Fuel company in 2012.

AD Macuácua participated in the Moçambola for the first time in 2017, following promotion for winning the 2016 Moçambola 2 (South Zone) championship. The club finished bottom of the league in 2017 and were relegated.

References

Football clubs in Mozambique
Association football clubs established in 2012
2012 establishments in Mozambique